A golem is an artificial animated being in medieval and Jewish folklore.

Golem or The Golem may also refer to:

Film
 The Golem (1915 film), a film by Paul Wegener and Henrik Galeen
 The Golem: How He Came into the World, a 1920 film also starring Paul Wegener
 Le Golem or The Golem: The Legend of Prague, a 1936 film by Julien Duvivier
 Golem (film), a 2000 film by Louis Nero
 The Golem (2018 film), a 2018 Jewish horror film directed by the Paz Brothers
 The Limehouse Golem (2016 film)
 Golem Creations, a production company

Gaming
 Golem (Dungeons & Dragons), a man-made creature in Dungeons & Dragons
 Golem (Pokémon), a Pokémon
 Golem (2018 video game), a 2018 video game by Longbow Games
 Golem (2019 video game), a 2019 video game by Highwire Games
 Golem, a troop featured in the mobile games Clash of Clans and Clash Royale; variations include an Ice Golem and an Elixir Golem

Literature
 Golem (comics), a Marvel Comics heroic monster
 The Golem (Meyrink novel), a 1914 novel by Gustav Meyrink
 The Golem (Singer novel), a 1969 novel by Isaac Bashevis Singer
 Golem (Wisniewski book), a 1996 picture book by David Wisniewski
 The Golem (Leivick), a 1921 dramatic poem by H. Leivick
 El Golem, a 1964 poem by Jorge Luis Borges
 "Golem" (short story), a comical short story by Lee Yeongdo 
 The Golem: What You Should Know About Science, a book on the sociology of science by Harry Collins and Trevor Pinch

Music
 Golem (band), a German death metal band
 Golem (klezmer band), a New York-based band
 The Golem (album), a soundtrack by Black Francis for the 1920 film The Golem: How He Came into the World
 Golem, track 8 from the 1991 album Angel Rat by Voivod

Opera
 Golem (Bretan opera)  Golem lásadása, a 1923 opera by Nicolae Bretan
 Golem (Casken opera), a 1991 opera by John Casken
 Der Golem (opera), a 1926 opera by Eugen d'Albert based on Holitscher's play
 The Golem, a 1962 opera by Abraham Ellstein
 The Golem, a 1980 grand opera by Larry Sitsky

People
 Golem of Kruja,  1250s, an Albanian nobleman

Places

In Albania:
 Golem, Fier, a subdivision of the municipality of Lushnjë, Fier County
 Golem, Tirana, a village in the municipality of Kavajë, Tirana County
 Golem Grad, an island in Lake Prespa in Macedonia

Technology
 Golem (ILP), an inductive logic programming system
 Sky Golem, a Czech paraglider design
 Golem, a series of computers built at the Weizmann Institute in Rehovot, Israel
 Golaem, a software developer

See also 
 Golem XIV, a 1981 novel by Stanisław Lem
 Gollum, a character in J. R. R. Tolkien's Middle-earth
 Gollum (disambiguation)
 :Category:Fictional golems